The 1974–75 Texaco Cup was the fifth and last edition of the tournament sponsored by Texaco. It was won by Newcastle United, who beat Southampton in a two-legged final by 3–1 on aggregate.

Group stage

Group A

Group B

Group C

Group D

Quarter-finals

1st Leg

2nd Leg

Semi-finals

1st Leg

2nd Leg

Final

1st Leg

2nd Leg

Notes and references

 

1974–75 in English football
1974–75 in Scottish football
England–Scotland relations